Lunatics and Poets is a 2004 album by the Red Elvises.

Track listing 
Ocean
Venice, USA
Night Butterfly
Love Rocket
Wind
Winter Reggae
Ticket To Japan
Memoirs Of A Phuket Geisha
Juliet
Tchaikovski
Party Like A Rock Star
This Music Is Wasted If We Don't Dance

All songs written by Igor Yuzov

Personnel 

 Igor Yuzov - Banjo, Bass, Composer, Guitar, Vocals
 Oleg Bernov - Bass, Engineer, Guitar, Percussion, Programming, Vocals
 George Earth - Theremin
 Chris Golden - Bass
 Ted Kamp - Bass (Acoustic)
 Nickolai Kurganov - Violin
 Dmitri Mamokhin - Trumpet
 Oleg Schramm - Accordion, Organ (Hammond), Piano
 Jay Work - Flute, Saxophone
 Toshi Yanagi - Guitar
 Adam Gust - Drums
 Evan Biegel - Engineer
 Barry Conley - Mixing
 Erik Hockman - Mastering, Mixing
 Christie Moeller - Package Design

References 

Red Elvises albums
2004 albums